Open the Gates is the third record by free jazz collective Irreversible Entanglements. It was released through Don Giovanni Records and International Anthem in November 2021.

Composition
Musically, Open the Gates sees the quintet merge their free jazz roots with "mutant" funk and "angular" post-punk.

Critical reception

Open the Gates was acclaimed by music critics. On Metacritic, it holds a score of 86 out of 100, indicating "universal acclaim", based on five reviews.

Dustin Krcatovich for The Quietus called it "righteous music", seeing it as "an exciting dilation of [the quintet's] sonic universe".

Track listing

Personnel
Credits adapted from Bandcamp.

Irreversible Entanglements
 Camae Ayewa - voice, synth
 Keir Neuringer - saxophone, synth, percussion
 Aquiles Navarro - trumpet, synth
 Luke Stewart - double bass, bass guitar
 Tcheser Holmes - drums, percussion

Technical
 Irreversible Entanglements - production
 Michael Richelle - recording
 Dave Vettraino - mixing at International Anthem Studios, Chicago
 Dave Cooley - mastering at Elysian Masters, Los Angeles

References

 2021 albums
 Don Giovanni Records albums
International Anthem Recording Company albums